Foreign Affair is a 1958 album by Frankie Laine with the orchestra of Michel Legrand. High Fidelity commented that "Frankie Laine throbs his breathy way through an international potpourri in five languages — all marked with a heavy American accent." The album was followed by a second collaboration with Legrand the next year, Reunion in Rhythm.

Track listing
Laura - (David Raksin, Johnny Mercer)
Mam'selle
Addormentarmi Cosi
Autumn Leaves - (Joseph Kosma, Jacques Prévert)
Não Tem Solução
La Paloma
Mona Lisa
Si Tu Partais
Quiéreme Mucho
Torna a Surriento
Too Young
Bésame Mucho

References

1958 albums
Frankie Laine albums